William Ridout Wadsworth (December 17, 1875 – August 29, 1971) was a Canadian rower who competed in the 1904 Summer Olympics. In 1904 he was a member of Canadian boat, which won the silver medal in the men's eight.

References

External links
 William Wadsworth's profile at databaseOlympics.com
 William Wadsworth's profile at Sports Reference.com
 William Wadsworth's obituary

1875 births
1971 deaths
Canadian male rowers
Olympic rowers of Canada
Rowers at the 1904 Summer Olympics
Olympic silver medalists for Canada
Olympic medalists in rowing
Medalists at the 1904 Summer Olympics